State Trunk Highway 183 (often called Highway 183, STH-183 or WIS 183) was a state highway in the U.S. state of Wisconsin. It ran north–south between WIS 35 near Pepin and WIS 29 near Spring Valley.  The now-decommissioned highway was turned over to local control, and is now designated as County Trunk Highway CC (CTH-CC) in Pepin and Pierce counties.

Route description
Sites along the route, from south to north, include the Little House Wayside and the unincorporated communities of Lund (on the border between Pepin and Pierce counties, at the highway's junctions with CTH-J and CTH-SS), Ono (at the junction with US Highway 10, US 10), Waverly (at the junction with WIS 72), and Olivet (on the boundary between the Pierce County towns of Gilman and Spring Lake).

History
Highway 183 was first designated in 1947 from Spring Valley to US Highway 10. It was extended south to Pepin in 1949. The highway was given to local control around 1989.

Major intersections

See also

References

183
Transportation in Pepin County, Wisconsin
Transportation in Pierce County, Wisconsin